Vishal Mangalwadi (born 1949) is a social reformer, political columnist, Indian Christian philosopher, writer and lecturer.

Early life
Vishal was born in Chhattarpur (M.P.), India, to Victor and Kusum Mangalwadi and grew up along with his six siblings in the states of Uttar Pradesh and Madhya Pradesh.

Education and career
Vishal Mangalwadi graduated from the University of Allahabad in 1969 and earned an MA in philosophy from the University of Indore in 1973. In 1974, Mangalwadi co-founded The Theological Research and Communication Institute (TRACI) and began to develop his master's thesis into his first book, The World of Gurus, published by Vikas Publishing House in 1977 and serialized in the weekly magazine, Sunday.

In 1975, Mangalwadi married Ruth from Bareilly (Uttar Pradesh), a graduate of Lucknow University who returned to India after obtaining a master's degree in theology from Wheaton College in Wheaton, Illinois, USA. In 1976, they moved to his father's farm in Gatheora village in Chhatarpur District and founded a non-profit organization, the Association For Comprehensive Rural Assistance (ACRA), to serve the rural poor and transform their caste-based feudal social system. His work was opposed and violently resisted. In 1980, he was briefly incarcerated in Tikamgarh Jail where he began writing his second book, Truth and Social Reform. During the anti-Sikh riots that followed the assassination of Prime Minister Indira Gandhi in 1984, his organization was also burned down.

From 1984 to 1987, Mangalwadi was the honorary director of TRACI and published Truth and Social Reform. In 1984, he was appointed the Convenor of the Peasant's Commission of the Janata Party. In 1987, he initiated a national movement against the revival of sati. From 1988 to 1994, he was an assistant to Kanshiram, the founder of the Bahujan Samaj Party.

Since 1996, he has been writing, lecturing and publishing around the world. In 2003, William Carey International University awarded him a Doctorate in Laws. In 2009, he published the US edition of Truth and Transformation encouraging local churches around the world to double up as centers of learning and service, offering tuition-free, internet based college education. 

In 2010, a pilot project began in Indonesia. Mangalwadi continues to travel around the world to promote this vision of church and Internet based higher education. The vision of church and internet based college education has been institutionalized in two organizations: CACHE (Church and Community Centred Higher Education) is implementing it in Africa and other non-western nations, and Virtues Inc is implementing the concept in the USA. Vishal used to write regularly for the New Delhi-based bilingual monthly FORWARD Press. From 2014-17 he served as an Honorary Professor of Applied Theology and the Director of Centre for Human Resource Development at Sam Higginbottom University of Agriculture, Technology, and Sciences. Now he is a public speaker.

Works

Books published
This Book Changed Everything - Volume I: The Bible's Amazing Impact on Our World (2019)
The Open Wounds of Islam (German, 2016)
Why Are We Backward?: Exploring the Roots, Exploding the Myths, Embracing True Hope (2013)
The Book that Made Your World: How the Bible Created the Soul of Western Civilization (2011)
Truth and Transformation: A Manifesto for Ailing Nations (2009)
Obama, Presidency, and the Bible (2008)
Astrology (2002)
Spirituality of Hate: A Futuristic Perspective on Indo-Pakistan Conflict (2002)
The Quest for Freedom and Dignity: Caste, Conversion, and Cultural Revolution (2001)
Burnt Alive: The Staines and the God They Loved — with Vijay Martis, M.B. Desai, Babu K. Verghese and Radha Samuel (2000)
Why Must You Convert? (1999)
Corruption Vs. True Spirituality — with Francis Schaeffer (1998)
India: The Grand Experiment (1997)
Missionary Conspiracy: Letters to a Postmodern Hindu (1996)
What Liberates a Woman?: The Story of Pandita Ramabai - A Builder of Modern India — with Nicol McNicol (1996)
The Legacy of William Carey: A Model for the Transformation of a Culture — with Ruth Mangalwadi (1993)
In Search of Self: Beyond the New Age; also titled When the New Age Gets Old: Looking for a Greater Spirituality (1992)
Truth and Social Reform (1989)
William Carey and the regeneration of India (1977) — with Ruth Mangalwadi and Darrow L. Miller
The World of Gurus (1977)
Dear Rajan: Letters to a New Believer (1972)

Book reviews
The World of Gurus: "This volume examines the social and historical background, the religious intellectual impulses, and the religious and cultural aspirations of humanity that have produced the institution of gurudom" - The Companion.

References

External links 
 Vishal Mangalwadi's official web site
 Vishal Mangalwadi's blog

1949 births
Living people
People from Chhatarpur
Indian Christians
Writers from Madhya Pradesh
20th-century Indian philosophers
21st-century Indian philosophers
Indian Christian writers
Activists from Madhya Pradesh
Indian social reformers
University of Allahabad alumni
World Christianity scholars